Ana I. Domingos is a Portuguese neuroscientist specialising in the reduction of obesity independently of food intake. She is an Associate Professor of Neuroscience at the Department of Physiology, Anatomy and Genetics of the University of Oxford in the United Kingdom, as well as a Teaching Fellow at Lady Margaret Hall, Oxford.

Training
Between 1995 and 1999, Domingos studied mathematics up to MSc level at the University of Lisbon. She then studied for a PhD in neurobiology at the Rockefeller University in New York City, supervised by Leslie B. Vosshall.

Career
Between 2006 and 2013, Domingos did post-doctoral work with Jeffrey M. Friedman at the Rockefeller University. She then returned to Portugal to work at the Obesity Laboratory of the Instituto Gulbenkian de Ciência in Oeiras near the Portuguese capital, Lisbon. In 2018 she moved to Oxford in the UK, with a research award from the Howard Hughes Medical Institute, to work at the Department of Physiology, Anatomy and Genetics of the University of Oxford, where she heads the laboratory that bears her name. She is also funded by the Wellcome Trust and the European Research Council.

Her laboratory researches neuroimmune mechanisms underlying obesity. It has identified sympathetic neuron-associated macrophages (SAMs) that import and metabolize norepinephrine, which can lead to fat mass reduction. In a collaborative effort with the University of Cambridge, Domingos has developed a new class of anti-obesity compounds that could potentially avoid the harmful side effects of traditional treatments.

Publications
Domingos has published widely in peer-reviewed journals. A selection of her articles for which she has been the sole author or lead article follows. In addition, she is a member of the Advisory Board of the journal, Cell Metabolism.	
AI Domingos, J Vaynshteyn, HU Voss, X Ren, V Gradinaru, F Zang, et al. Leptin regulates the reward value of nutrient. Nature neuroscience 14 (12), 1562-1568
AI Domingos, A Sordillo, MO Dietrich, ZW Liu, LA Tellez, J Vaynshteyn, et al. Hypothalamic melanin concentrating hormone neurons communicate the nutrient value of sugar. Elife 2, e01462
AI Domingos, J Vaynshteyn, A Sordillo, JM Friedman. The reward value of sucrose in leptin-deficient obese mice. Molecular metabolism 3 (1), 73-80	279
AI Domingos. Leptin: a missing piece in the immunometabolism puzzle. Nature Reviews Immunology 20 (1), 3-3
A Domingos. Lean on Leptin or Lean for Sugar. J Obes Wt Loss Ther 3 (166), 2

References

External links
Talk on Neuroimmunometabolism by Domingos (in English)
 Domingos discusses obesity
Domingos discusses optogenetics to study the relationship between the immune system and sympathetic nervous system

Year of birth missing (living people)  
Living people
Portuguese neurologists
University of Lisbon alumni
Rockefeller University alumni
Portuguese women scientists